Mordellistena takizawai is a species of beetle in the genus Mordellistena of the family Mordellidae. It was described by Kôno in 1932.

References

External links
Coleoptera. BugGuide.

Beetles described in 1932
takizawai
Taxa named by Hiromichi Kono